Soft set theory is a generalization of fuzzy set theory, that was proposed by Molodtsov in 1999 to deal with uncertainty in a parametric manner.  A soft set is a parameterised family of sets - intuitively, this is "soft" because the boundary of the set depends on the parameters.  Formally, a soft set, over a universal set X and set of parameters E is a pair (f, A) where A is a subset of E, and f is a function from A to the power set of X.  For each e in A, the set f(e) is called the value set of e in (f, A).

One of the most important steps for the new theory of soft sets was to define mappings on soft sets, which was achieved in 2009 by the mathematicians Athar Kharal and Bashir Ahmad, with the results published in 2011. Soft sets have also been applied to the problem of medical diagnosis for use in medical expert systems.
Fuzzy soft sets have also been introduced. Mappings on fuzzy soft sets were defined and studied by Kharal and Ahmad.

Notes

References 
Molodtsov D. A. A theory of soft sets. Moscow: Editorial URSS, 2004.
Matsievsky S. V. Sets, multisets, fuzzy and soft sets without universe. Vestnik IKSUR, 2007, N. 10, pp. 44–52.
Ahmad, B., Kharal, A.On Fuzzy Soft Sets. Advances in Fuzzy Systems Volume 2009 (2009), Article ID 586507, 6 pages .

Set theory